Rumen Aleksandrov   is a Bulgarian weightlifter. He won the Silver medal in the 90 Kg class in the  1980 Summer Olympics in Moscow. He was champion of Europe in 1980, in Belgrade, Serbia. Aleksandrov is also world and european junior champion in 1978 in Athens, Greece.

He started training weightlifting in 1971 under Gancho Karushkov. He graduated from the Vasil Levski Sports School and competed for the team of Maritsa Plovdiv (1971 – 1978) and for the team of CSKA (1978 – 1982). Since 1982 he has been a coach at the team of CSKA. Between 1989 and 1992 he worked with the national team of Bulgaria. He shared his experience in many countries around the world, including the United States and Colombia.

References 

Bulgarian male weightlifters
Olympic weightlifters of Bulgaria
Weightlifters at the 1980 Summer Olympics
Olympic silver medalists for Bulgaria
Olympic medalists in weightlifting
1960 births
Living people
Medalists at the 1980 Summer Olympics
20th-century Bulgarian people
21st-century Bulgarian people